The Trans-Pecos striped whiptail (Aspidoscelis inornatus heptagrammus) is a subspecies of the little striped whiptail (Aspidoscelis inornatus) lizard. It is found in the semiarid, sandy habitats of the Chihuahuan Desert, in the United States from West Texas across southern New Mexico to Arizona, as well as northern Mexico. It is sometimes referred to as the Arizona striped whiptail or seven-striped whiptail.

Description 
The Trans-Pecos spotted whiptail is gray or black in color, with six to eight yellow or white stripes which run along the body from head to tail. Unlike other species of whiptail lizards, they have no spotting between their stripes. Their undersides are white or pale blue in color, and often they have light blue on the sides of their heads and tails. They are thin-bodied, and have a tail that is typically almost three times the length of their bodies.

Behavior 
Like most species of whiptail lizard, Trans-Pecos spotted whiptails are diurnal and insectivorous.

References 
Herps of Texas: Cnemidophorus inornatus heptagrammus
New Mexico Game & Fish Species Account: Cnemidophorus inornatus heptagrammus

Aspidoscelis
Fauna of the Chihuahuan Desert
Fauna of the Sonoran Desert
Reptiles of the United States
Reptiles of Mexico